Rashtreeya Vidyalaya Road is a metro station on the Green Line of the Namma Metro serving the 5th and 8th Block of Jayanagar area of Bangalore, India. It was opened to the public on 18 June 2017. It is also going to be the starting station for the upcoming Yellow Line.

Station layout

Entry/Exits
There are 2 Entry/Exit points – A and B. Commuters can use either of the points for their travel.

 Entry/Exit point A: Towards Jayanagar 5th Block side
 Entry/Exit point B: Towards Jayanagar 7th/8th Blocks side with wheelchair accessibility

See also

Bangalore
List of Namma Metro stations
Transport in Karnataka
List of metro systems
List of rapid transit systems in India

References

External links

 Bangalore Metro Rail Corporation Ltd. (Official site)
 UrbanRail.Net – descriptions of all metro systems in the world, each with a schematic map showing all stations.

Namma Metro stations
Railway stations in India opened in 2017
2017 establishments in Karnataka
Railway stations in Bangalore